CatalanGate is a 2022 political scandal involving accusations of espionage using the NSO Group's Pegasus spyware, against figures of the Catalan independence movement. Targets of the supposed espionage included elected officials (including the four presidents of the Generalitat of Catalonia since 2010, two presidents of the Parliament of Catalonia, and MEPs), activists, lawyers, and computer scientists; in some cases, families of the main targets were also purportedly targeted.

The scandal was unleashed by the publication of an article in the New Yorker magazine, quoting studies by the University of Toronto's Citizen Lab, in which they examined the use of Pegasus spyware by different countries (Pegasus is only sold to governments who, according to Israel's own government, follow rule of law), and alleged to have found evidence of its use in phones owned by several Catalan separatist politicians and their entourage. The study completely overlooked the publicly-known fact that many of those politicians had recently been involved in (and tried for, and in some instances found guilty of) several crimes and misdemeanors, from embezzlement to sedition, and were in fact under judicially-approved government surveillance. The domain catalangate.cat was registered by Òmnium Cultural on 28 January 2022 - months before the espionage scandal which came to be known as CatalanGate came to light. and the "CatalanGate" name itself was coined by separatist politician Ernest Maragall, as reported by a book written by leading separatist activist (see quotes below) in which he relates how Citizen Lab produced tailored research to build judiciary evidence for large technology companies targeting NSO Group in the US courts; evidence of indirect funding by Apple and others has already been found. Together with alleged deficiencies in the research methodology   (including the fact that the lead evidence gatherer on behalf of Citizen Lab was a known separatist activist, but also including deficient methodology), this has founded accusations from several instances (most notably the "Foro de Profesores" collective) that the scandal is essentially a publicity stunt  to discredit the Spanish government's investigations into past and continuing criminal activity by the surveilled people, and to cover earlier surveillance by the regional secessionist government of opposition politicians.

According to Spanish defense officials and to ex-president of the Generalitat Carles Puigdemont (himself the subject of a suspended Euro detention order for his alleged actions), he and his inner circle had been aware of CitizenLab's findings for over a year and pushed to release the findings (against the wishes of CitizenLab which sought to gather additional evidence before revealing their findings) to try to deflect attention from Puigdemont's ties with Russia and Putin as well as to influence the upcoming CJEU ruling regarding Puigdemont's immunity. 

The Citizen Lab report was published on April 18, 2022. The report identified up to 65 alleged victims, consummated or attempted. The number of targets exceeded previous cases of espionage studied by Citizen Lab, far surpassing those of Al Jazeera (36 victims) and El Salvador (35 victims). Citizen Lab did not definitively attribute the responsibility for the attacks to a particular perpetrator, however, it went on to state that circumstantial evidence strongly suggests the perpetrator to be the Spanish Government. The term CatalanGate was used as  title of the Citizen Lab report. Despite the scandal's dissemination as CatalanGate, it also allegedly affected two prominent Basque pro-independence figures.

Background 
The investigation into the spying was conducted and published by Citizen Lab, a Canadian interdisciplinary laboratory, based at the Munk School of Global Affairs at the University of Toronto, which focuses on research, development, strategic policy and high-level legal engagement at the confluence of information and communication technologies, human rights and global security.

Previously (in 2019), Citizen Lab worked on a case involving Pegasus infections that exploited a WhatsApp security bug that - between April and May 2019 - enabled infiltration of at least 1,400 terminals. Among the people alerted to the problem was the President of the Parliament, Roger Torrent, who was the first to jump into the media when El País and The Guardian reported on the subject in July 2020. The same case involved Ernest Maragall, Anna Gabriel -who exiled in Switzerland-, the activist member of the ANC Jordi Domingo, and Sergi Miquel Rodríquez, member of Carles Puigdemont's team. Basque leaders Arnaldo Otegi and Jon Iñarritu were also cited in the list of people presumably subject to secret scrutiny in the same program.

The investigation was initiated by ERC MEP Jordi Solé who - a few weeks before replacing Oriol Junqueras as a Member of the European Parliament in June 2020 - suspected that he was a victim of cell phone spying and contacted security researcher Elies Campo, a former WhatsApp employee and outspoken Catalan independence supporter who collaborates with Citizen Lab.

The officials affected by the surveillance belong to the leadership of the political parties involved in organizing the 2017 illegal referendum and the later secession attempt (and coordinated violent activism  after it failed). Some stood trial and were convicted  (and have since been pardoned) while others fled justice, for misdemeanors ranging from embezzlement to rebellion and sedition. Others are still being investigated. Those parties remain in regional government.

CatalanGate scandal 
Collaboration between potential victims and Citizen Lab helped identify at least 65 people supposedly attacked or infected with the spyware, 63 of them with Pegasus and 4 with Candiru (two victims were targeted using both). The actual figure could be higher as Citizen Lab's tools are developed for use with iOS systems and, in Spain, Android devices predominate (80% of the total in 2021). A selection of the cases was also analyzed by Amnesty International's Tech Lab, and the results independently validated the forensic methodology used. Virtually all incidents correspond to the period between 2017 and 2020 (although Jordi Sanchez suffered an attempted infection via SMS in 2015).

In its report, Citizen Lab states that "while we do not attribute the operation to a specific government entity at this time, the circumstantial evidence shows a strong link to the Spanish government, especially given the nature of the individuals targeted, the timing of the attacks, and the fact that Spain is listed as a client of NSO Group". It omits any reference to the fact that many of the supposedly surveilled people were in fact under judicially approved investigation for recent or ongoing activities including embezzklement and sedition.

Once the scandal reached Spanish parliament, government officials produced documentation to certify that 29 people were indeed subject to government surveillance, fully approved by the Supreme Court of Justice and according to legal procedure. The surveilled people included past and serving elected officials and regional authorities belonging to parties involved in the 2017 illegal secession attempt.

Methods of infiltration 
In some cases (and as is often the case), the attack was carried out by an intermediary: infecting, or attempting to infect, the terminal of family members or people close to the target to be spied on.

Pegasus

A peculiarity of this case for Citizen Lab was the discovery of a new iOS zero-click vulnerability, which they called HOMAGE, that had not previously been seen used by NSO Group, and which was effective against some versions prior to 13.2.

Candiru

Citizen Lab identified four victims of espionage involving Candiru. Candiru spyware was used to infiltrate the targets' personal computers. The targets were sent emails containing malicious links and enticed to click on them, with their personal computers becoming infected with Candiru spyware once they clicked on the link. A total of seven such emails was identified. Some of the emails appeared to be messages from a Spanish governmental institution with public health recommendations in connection to the 2019 coronavirus epidemic.

List of victims 
With the exception of four people who requested anonymity, this is the list of victims of the CatalanGate espionage case:

Reactions

Press coverage 
On the same day that saw the publication of CitizenLab's technical report, The New Yorker published an extensive report entitled "How democracies spy on their citizens" (of which the Catalan case occupied a seventh part) as their cover story.

Catalan government response 
On April 19 (one day after the initial publication of the revelations), Carles Puigdemont and Oriol Junqueras appeared in the European Parliament to denounce the spying perpetrated upon the pro-independence leaders, an intervention that was joined by the Popular Unity Candidacy, the Catalan National Assembly, and Òmnium Cultural. John-Scott Railton, from Citizen Lab, also took part, detailing "circumstantial evidence": that agencies linked to the structure of the Spanish State would have used Pegasus and Candiru to infiltrate the cell phones of the victims for political purposes. The previous March, the European Parliament had approved the creation of a committee of inquiry called Committee to investigate the use of Pegasus surveillance spyware on the alleged use of Pegasus surveillance spyware against journalists, politicians, security agents, diplomats, lawyers, businessmen, civil society actors and other citizens in, among other countries, Hungary and Poland, and whether such use had infringed European Union law and fundamental rights. The first meeting of the committee was held the same day that Puigdemont and Junqueras denounced the spying.

References 

Spyware
News leaks
Scandals in Spain